Hiwannee is an unincorporated community in Wayne County, in the U.S. state of Mississippi.

History
A post office called Hiwannee was established in 1901, and remained in operation until 1973. Hiwannee is a name derived from the Choctaw language purported to mean "fruit-destroying insect". Variant transliterations are "Hewhannee" and "Hiyoowanne".

References

Unincorporated communities in Mississippi
Unincorporated communities in Wayne County, Mississippi
Mississippi placenames of Native American origin